"Carrier Of A Secret" is a single from the Norwegian singer Sissel's All Good Things album, released in 2002. It is a pop-ballad written by David Forman and Jørn Dahl, who also produced the song. This song exists in three different versions: the album version on All Good Things, the cd-single version and the re-recorded version on Sissel.

Track listing
 "Carrier Of A Secret"
 "Molde Canticle"
 "Where the Lost Ones Go"

2002 singles
2002 songs
Sissel Kyrkjebø songs
Universal Records singles